State Route 181 (SR 181) is a state highway in the northeastern part of the U.S. state of Georgia. It runs west–east through portions of Hart county.

Route description
The route begins at an intersection with US 29/SR 8 south of Lake Hartwell. It heads southeast, and then curves northeast until it meets its eastern terminus at the South Carolina state line southeast of Lake Hartwell. When SR 181 reaches the state line at the Savannah River, the roadway continues east as South Carolina Highway 181.

Major intersections

See also

References

External links

 Georgia Roads (Routes 181 - 200)

181
Transportation in Hart County, Georgia